"Méchant" is a 2019 song by French rapper Niska featuring Ninho. The song peaked atop the French SNEP singles chart, making it Niska's second chart-topping song of the year following "Médicament". The accompanying music video for the song was released on 23 December 2019. It is Niska's third collaboration with Ninho.

Charts

Certifications

References

2019 singles
2019 songs
Niska (rapper) songs
SNEP Top Singles number-one singles
French-language songs